State Route 352 (SR 352) is a primary state highway in the U.S. state of Virginia. Known as St. Charles Road, the state highway runs  from U.S. Route 421 (US 421) near Pennington Gap to SR 634 and SR 636 in St. Charles in northern Lee County.

Route description

SR 352 begins at an intersection with US 421 on the north side of Stone Mountain and west of Pennington Gap. The state highway follows Straight Creek and Norfolk Southern's St. Charles Branch rail line north to the town of St. Charles. Within the town, the state highway reaches its northern terminus at a three-way intersection with SR 634 (Bonny Blue Road) and SR 636 (Monarch Road).

Major intersections

References

External links

 Virginia Highways Project: VA 352

352
State Route 352